Daniel Ryan (born c. 1930 - died February 15, 1961) was an American ice dancer who competed with partner Carol Ann Peters.

After his competitive career ended, Ryan became a skating coach.  He was en route to the World Figure Skating Championships in 1961 with his pupils, Larry Pierce and Diane Sherbloom, when their plane (Sabena Flight 548) crashed near Brussels, Belgium, killing all on board.  Ryan was 31 at the time of his death.

Results
(with Carol Ann Peters)

External links
U.S. Figure Skating biography

Navigation

Year of birth missing
American male ice dancers
1961 deaths
Victims of aviation accidents or incidents in Belgium
World Figure Skating Championships medalists
Victims of aviation accidents or incidents in 1961